Mateusz Urbański (born March 10, 1990 in Maków Podhalański) is a Polish football defender who plays for Cracovia.

During the season 2012-2013, he stay playing with the OKS Brzesko up to the winter when he moved to the Pogoń Siedlce in 1 Liga where he was still a defender. Then in 2014-2015, he was defender with Limanovia Limanowa in Ewinner II Liga. The following season, he played in 3 Liga (Group 4) with the football club of Podhale Nowy Targ.

References

External links 
 

1990 births
Living people
Polish footballers
MKS Cracovia (football) players
People from Maków Podhalański
Sportspeople from Lesser Poland Voivodeship
Association football defenders